The 2022 Sacramento State Hornets football team represented California State University, Sacramento as a member of the Big Sky Conference during the 2022 NCAA Division I FCS football season. They were led by third-year head coach Troy Taylor and played their home games at Hornet Stadium.

This season set multiple milestones for the team. They beat an FBS team for the first time since 2012 and the first time under Troy Taylor with a 41–10 victory over Colorado State. The Hornets claimed their best start to a season in school history when they won their seventh game against Montana 31–24 in overtime, and would go on to complete their first perfect regular season in school history following a 27–21 victory over UC Davis. They won their first ever FCS playoff game with a 38–31 win over Richmond. However, in the highest-scoring game in FCS playoff history, they would be upset by Incarnate Word in the quarterfinals by a score of 66–63.

Previous season
The Hornets finished the 2021 season 9–3, 8–0 in Big Sky play to win the Big Sky championship. They received an automatic bid to the FCS Playoffs where, after a first round bye, they lost to South Dakota State in the second round.

Preseason

Polls
On July 25, 2022, during the virtual Big Sky Kickoff, the Hornets were predicted to finish second in the Big Sky by the coaches and third by the media.

Preseason All–Big Sky team
The Hornets had five players selected to the preseason all-Big Sky team.

Offense

Marshel Martin – TE

Pierre Williams – WR

Brandon Weldon – OL

Asher O'Hara – QB

Special teams

Kyle Sentkowski – K

Schedule

Game summaries

Utah Tech

at Northern Iowa

at Colorado State

at Cal Poly

Northern Colorado

at Eastern Washington

No. 7 Montana

No. 14 Idaho

at No. 5 Weber State

at Portland State

No. 24 UC Davis

FCS Playoffs

No. 13 Richmond – Second Round

No. 5 Incarnate Word – Quarterfinals

Ranking movements

References

Sacramento State
Sacramento State Hornets football seasons
Big Sky Conference football champion seasons
Sacramento State
Sacramento State Hornets football